The Royal Archives, also known as the King's Archives, is a division of The Royal Household of the Sovereign of the United Kingdom. It is operationally under the control of the Keeper of the Royal Archives, who is customarily the Private Secretary to the Sovereign. Although sovereigns have kept records for centuries, the Royal Archives was formally established as recently as 1912 and occupies part of the Round Tower of Windsor Castle. Since the Royal Archives are privately owned, requests for public access must be approved based on the needs and qualifications of the researcher.

History 
Following Queen Victoria’s death in 1901, an appointment for Keeper of the Royal Archives was made by Edward VII to safeguard the queen’s “collection of official and private correspondence.” At the behest of George V, this archive along with other royal collections were relocated for storage and display within the Round Tower of Windsor Castle in 1914. Through the attainment of additional records and collections through various means of acquisition, the Royal Archives gradually increased in scale. The tower’s renovation and subsequent expansion decades later successfully addressed spatial constraints and provided more effective methods of archival preservation.

Stewardship 
The King's Archives is the responsibility of the Assistant Keeper of the King's Archives (also The Librarian, Royal Library), and professional staff under the Archives Services Manager who is in charge of the day-to-day work in the archives. There are several qualified Archivists, as well as a small clerical staff. In addition to paid staff, volunteers are crucial in maintaining collections, developing exhibitions, and facilitating research. Benefiting from the use of the Collections Management System, CALM, Royal Archives staff ensure that collections in the royal archives are efficiently catalogued and made accessible digitally.

Sir John Wheeler-Bennett, GCVO, MCG, OBE, FRSL, FBA, was Historical Adviser to the Queen's Archives from 1959 to 1975.

Appointed Keepers 
Reginald Brett, 2nd Viscount Esher was the first appointment as Keeper of the Royal Archives.

 Clive Wigram (1931 to 1945) 
 Sir Alan Frederick Lascelles (1945 to 1953) 
 Sir Michael Edward Adeane (1953 to 1972) 
 Sir Martin Michael Charles Charteris (1972 to 1977) 
 Sir Phillip Brian Cecil Moore (1977 to 1986) 
 Sir William Frederick Payne Heseltine (1986 to 1990) 
 Sir Robert Fellowes (1990 to 1999) 
 Sir Robin Janvrin (1999 to 2007) 
 Sir Christopher Geidt (2007-2017) 
 Sir Edward Young is the current Keeper of the Royal Archives since 2017.

Collections 
Comprising collections including diaries, letters, household papers. and administrative records, the Royal Archives retain significant personal and official information about the British monarchy (also Monarchy of the United Kingdom). The Royal Photograph Collection also occupies part of the Round Tower and holds over 400 000 items of photographic material from the Royal Collection. The Royal Photograph Collection is managed separately from the Royal Archives and is the responsibility of the Head Curator of the Photograph Collection, who reports to the Director of the Royal Collection.

Twentieth century royals including Edward VII, George V, Edward VIII, and George VI are well represented in the Royal Archives. Documents ranging from private correspondence to official government papers illustrate public engagement and diplomacy. Recent files and those currently in use are retained at Buckingham Palace.

In commemoration of the Royal Archives’ foundation, “Treasures from the Royal Archives” was published in 2014 and highlighted several noteworthy collections such as the Georgian Papers and the Letters of Queen Victoria.

Wardrobe, Household, and Estate Papers 
Presented to George V in 1914 by the Duke of Buccleuch was a collection of papers including bills and receipts detailing the purchases of royal furnishings and wardrobes. Currently the oldest records in the Royal Archives, the Wardrobe Papers originated from the Dukes of Montagu between 1660 and 1749. Records of the Royal Household including staff records are also stored at the Royal Archives for safekeeping and made available online for public research. These papers detail financial and managerial information of various royal estates during the eighteenth, nineteenth, and twentieth centuries.

Stuart and Cumberland Papers 
Following the death of Henry Benedict Stuart, papers and letters belonging to the Stuart lineage were acquired by George IV after eventually relocating from Rome to the Royal Archives through a complex set of circumstances. One of the first and oldest collections housed in the Royal Archives, the Stuart Papers are composed of letters, records, and other papers illustrating the Jacobite conflict between 1713 and 1770. Obtained around the same time as the Stuart Papers, records of the Duke of Cumberland were transferred to the Royal Archives in 1914. Significant moments in the Jacobite Rebellion from 1745 to 1757 were documented in military records and correspondence.

Georgian Papers 
In partnership with the Royal Library, The Omohundro Institute of Early American History and Culture, and the College of William and Mary, the Royal Archives are systematically cataloging the Georgian Papers, which will be made digitally accessible and searchable to users all over the world. As part of the Georgian Papers Programme, the Royal Archives plans to catalogue all its papers relating to the Hanoverian monarchy and make them freely available online by 2020.

Introduced to the Royal Archives in 1914, both official and private correspondence of George III and George IV were found in the care of the Duke of Wellington who presented them to George V upon discovery. Although a small amount of the Georgian Papers includes records from George I and George II, most of the collection represents George III and George IV.  This collection also includes a sample of essays and other personal writings of George III. Additionally, despite William IV’s official papers being destroyed after his death in 1837, records including personal accounts, military documents, and private correspondence have been preserved in the Royal Archives. As acting Prime Ministers under the reign of William IV and Queen Victoria, The 2nd Earl Grey and Lord Melbourne, produced a wealth of official correspondence during their time in service. Known as the Melbourne and Howick Papers, these documents detail noteworthy political and social affairs of the 1830s.

Queen Victoria's Papers 
Contributing to the documentation of Queen Victoria’s reign, Viscount Esher edited both private and official correspondence, which was later published and retained in the Royal Archives. The Queen's youngest daughter Princess Beatrice took on the responsibility of editing and transcribing her mother's personal journals. In 2012 the Archives successfully completed a project to scan Queen Victoria's journals and make them available online as a special project for the diamond jubilee of Victoria's great-great-granddaughter, Queen Elizabeth II. Access to this online archive is freely available in the UK but restricted to academic institutions and libraries abroad.

Unlike his mother, Queen Victoria, Edward VII ordered the destruction of most of his personal correspondence upon his death in 1910. Fortunately, the official records from his reign endured and are stored in the Royal Archives. The King’s Consort, Queen Alexandra, ordered that her papers be disposed of as well, however a collection of letters to and from her son, George V, have been maintained. Additionally, military papers belonging to the Duke of Cambridge were initially acquired by Queen Mary and are of great historical value at the Royal Archives.

See also
Royal Collection
Royal Library

References

External links

Queen Victoria's Journals

1911 establishments in the United Kingdom
Archives in the United Kingdom
Positions within the British Royal Household
Windsor Castle